Swanhaven is a coastal town in the City of Shoalhaven in New South Wales, Australia. It is located 5 km south of Sussex Inlet on the road to Berrara on the lagoon of Swan Lake and the Tasman Sea.

References

Towns in New South Wales
City of Shoalhaven
Towns in the South Coast (New South Wales)
Coastal towns in New South Wales